Elminius kingii is a species of symmetrical sessile barnacle in the family Elminiidae.

Description 
E. kingii lives in the southeast pacific ocean and southwest Atlantic ocean near Chile and Argentina. They lie in the depth range of 0-10 meters often found on rocks, shell and wood intertidal areas. Length, size and weight has not been recorded. Eggs hatch into planktonic naupii and leave the mantel cavity. Then they undergo six nauplair instars succeed by non feeding cypris larva. Then they will metamorphism into adults.

References

External links

 

Sessilia
Crustaceans of the eastern Pacific Ocean
Crustaceans of the Atlantic Ocean